Al Nahda National Schools is a private English language school in Abu Dhabi, United Arab Emirates which provides education in both the British and American curriculums. The school is divided into 3 campuses: a boys' campus (for boys in 4th grade and above), a girls' campus (for girls in 7th grade and above), and an elementary campus (for all children below 3rd grade, and girls up to 6th grade).

The school was founded in 1983 by Emirati businessman and entrepreneur Saeed Al-Junaibi.

History

Founding
The school was founded in 1983 by Saeed Al-Junaibi, and is one of the oldest schools in the United Arab Emirates.

Uniform 
The school's uniform consists of a light blue shirt (long or short-sleeved), dark blue trousers, and a dark navy jacket. The shirt and jacket are branded. The PE uniform consists of a white t-shirt with dark blue-black trousers.

Notable Visitors
The school has been visited by multiple noteworthy persons, including:

 Boxer Muhammad Ali, in 1986.
 Astronaut Michael López-Alegría, in 2018.

Accreditation
The school is accredited by the following International Schools and Colleges:
Council of International Schools
European Council of International Schools
New England Association of Schools and Colleges
Cambridge International Examinations
Edexcel
SAT
TOEFL
Associated Schools Project Network

Curriculum
The school gives students the option to choose between the American and British curriculums and conducts the following examinations:

SAT I and II
International General Certificate of Secondary Education (Cambridge International Examinations)
GCE Advanced Level (Edexcel and Cambridge International Examinations)
TOEFL
IELTS

References

External links 
 

Educational institutions established in 1983
Schools in Abu Dhabi
British international schools in the United Arab Emirates
1983 establishments in the United Arab Emirates